This is a list of past and present judges of the Supreme Court of Virginia.  The court's name was the Supreme Court of Appeals until it was changed in 1971. Members were titled Judge until a 1928 constitutional amendment changed the title to Justice and designated the presiding member Chief Justice.

Current justices

The court presently is made up of seven justices, each elected by a majority vote of both houses of the General Assembly for a term of twelve years. To be eligible for election, a candidate must be a resident of Virginia and must have been a member of the Virginia State Bar for at least five years. Vacancies on the court occurring between sessions of the General Assembly may be filled by the Governor for a term expiring thirty days after the commencement of the next session of the General Assembly. The Chief Justice presently is chosen by a vote of the seven justices for a term of four years. There is no statutory limit to the number of four-year terms to which a Chief Justice may be elected. However, the Court has stated that the justices internally adopted a two-term limit.

State law requires justices, like all Virginia jurists, to retire no later than twenty days after the commencement of the next regular session of the General Assembly following their seventy-third birthday. The court may designate up to five retired justices to serve as senior justices, each for a renewable one-year term. Senior justices may sit with the court either to hear petitions for appeal or to hear cases on the merits, particularly to replace any of the seven active justices who may be recused from hearing a specific case. In addition, a retired justice who has not been designated as a senior justice may sit with the court by special designation.

Active justices

Senior justices

Former justices

Members ex officio (1778–88)
The Constitution of 1776 provided for a Supreme Court of Appeals but did not specify its structure, leaving the General Assembly to organize the court by statute. The first such statute was enacted at the October 1778 legislative session. From that time until 1788, no one was appointed or elected specifically to serve on the Supreme Court of Appeals. Rather, the court was made up of the three judges of the High Court of Chancery, the five judges of the General Court, and the three judges of the Court of Admiralty, each of whom was elected by the General Assembly to life terms on those courts and served on the Supreme Court of Appeals ex officio.

The following judges were members of the court by virtue of having been elected judges of the High Court of Chancery, the General Court, and the Court of Admiralty, in the courts' order of precedence under the statute. The terms listed below run from each member's accession to those respective courts, which were created in 1776 and 1777, before the Supreme Court of Appeals was created. Ex officio membership ended on December 24, 1788, when the Supreme Court of Appeals became a separate body with five judges.

The High Court of Chancery:
 Edmund Pendleton, January 14, 1778 – December 24, 1788
 George Wythe, January 14, 1778 – December 24, 1788
 Robert Carter Nicholas Sr., January 14, 1778 – November 1780
 John Blair Jr., November 23, 1780 – December 24, 1788

The General Court:
 Paul Carrington, January 23, 1778 – December 24, 1788
 Thomas Mason, January 23, 1778 – May 28, 1778
 Joseph Jones, January 23, 1778 – October 1779
 John Blair Jr., January 23, 1778 – November 23, 1780
 John Tazewell, May 29, 1778 – November 1781
 Bartholomew Dandridge, May 29, 1778 – April 1785
 Peter Lyons, October 20, 1779 – December 24, 1788
 William Fleming, November 25, 1780 – December 24, 1788
 James Mercer, November 30, 1781 – December 24, 1788
 Henry Tazewell, April 25, 1785 – December 24, 1788
 Edmund Winston, December 11, 1788 – December 24, 1788

The Court of Admiralty:
 Richard Carey, December 17, 1776 – December 24, 1788
 Benjamin Holt, December 17, 1776 – unknown
 Bernard Moore, December 17, 1776 – unknown
 Benjamin Waller, May 1779 – December 1785
 William Roscoe Wilson Curl, May 1779 – unknown
 James Henry, unknown – December 24, 1788
 John Tyler, December 20, 1785 – December 24, 1788

Members since 1788
In December 1788, within the broad authority provided by the Constitution of 1776, the General Assembly re-organized the Supreme Court of Appeals as a separate court with five judges elected by the legislature to life terms. The General Assembly elected two incumbent judges of the High Court of Chancery and three incumbent judges of the General Court as the first judges of the Supreme Court of Appeals in their own right. While the court has remained separate ever since, the number of seats has varied. In January 1807, while one of the five seats was vacant, the General Assembly reduced the number to four with the provision that it be further reduced to three upon the next vacancy. The number was restored to five in January 1811.

The next significant alteration to the court came with the Constitution of 1851. It provided for the popular election of judges to the court, one from each of five districts, and imposed a twelve-year term. As the Emancipation Proclamation became effective in Virginia during the American Civil War (particularly after the Commonwealth surrendered in April 1865 and 13th Amendment became effective in December 1865), the 1851 Constitution's authorization of slavery became illegal under federal law. Thus, Virginia needed a new Constitution.

Federal authorities in occupied areas called a convention with delegates from occupied areas only, which proclaimed  the Constitution of 1864. Although voters statewide never were asked to authorize it in a referendum, it came into (disputed) effect, until a new state Constitution was adopted by popular referendum, then undisputedly came into effect in 1870. Federal military authorities allowed voters statewide to elect delegates to the Virginia Constitutional Convention of 1868. Virginia voters overwhelmingly ratified that document the following year, except for certain provisions penalizing former Confederates, which failed. The Constitution of 1864 had ended popular election of judges, instead providing (for the first time) that the General Assembly would elect the judges from candidates nominated by the Governor. It also reduced the court to three judges. On June 3, 1869, during Congressional Reconstruction, Major General John Schofield (who governed Virginia as Military District No. 1 and also led efforts to allow separate votes on the proposed Constitution and anti-Confederate provisions), dismissed all three elected judges because a new federal law required removal of officials in Texas and Virginia with any record of service to the Confederacy. On June 9, Schofield appointed three Union sympathizers (whom he had previously appointed judges of lower courts, where they had performed satisfactorily) as their replacements. Those three judges served (and issued binding rulings) until the new state Constitution came into effect and legislators elected replacements.

The post-Reconstruction Constitution of 1870 eliminated the short-lived provision for gubernatorial nominations, as well as restored the court to five judges. None of the three Union men was elected to the Court by the General Assembly. Legislators did elect two of the three judges elected by voters, and three additional judges. Legislation also allowed the court's members to elect their President, and in March 1870, the new Court elected R.C.L. Moncure (who had the most seniority) their President (the third man to hold that title).

The Constitution of 1902 staggered the five seats by requiring that at the next election of judges, one judge would be elected to a term of 4 years, one to a term of 6 years, one to a term of 8 years, one to a term of 10 years, and one to a term of 12 years. It perpetuated this staggering by providing that any new judge elected to fill a vacancy would serve only the unexpired portion of his predecessor's term.

In 1906, the General Assembly re-elected each of the five incumbent judges, whose terms were all due to expire the following January 1, to fill the newly staggered seats.  An amendment ratified in 1928 increased the number of seats to seven but it did not stagger the two new seats.  The Constitution of 1971 eliminated the staggering of seats by providing that any new judge elected to fill a vacancy serve a full twelve-year term.

These are the former members of the court from 1788, in order of their accession to office. Those who served as presiding officer are designated by italics.

 Edmund Pendleton, December 24, 1788 – October 23, 1803
 John Blair Jr., December 24, 1788 – September 30, 1789
 Paul Carrington, December 24, 1788 – January 1, 1807
 Peter Lyons, December 24, 1788 – July 30, 1809
 William Fleming, December 24, 1788 – February 15, 1824
 James Mercer, November 14, 1789 – October 1793
 Henry Tazewell, November 6, 1793 – November 1794
 Spencer Roane, April 13, 1795 – September 4, 1822
 St. George Tucker, April 11, 1804 – April 2, 1811
 James Pleasants, January 30, 1811 – March 1811
 Francis T. Brooke, March 4, 1811 – March 3, 1851
 William H. Cabell, April 3, 1811 – 1852
 John Coalter, June 1, 1811 – March 23, 1831
 John W. Green, October 11, 1822 – February 5, 1834
 Dabney Carr, February 24, 1824 – January 8, 1837
 Henry St. George Tucker Sr., March 1831 – 1841
 William Brockenbrough, February 20, 1834 – December 10, 1838
 Richard E. Parker, February 9, 1837 – September 10, 1840
 Robert Stanard, January 19, 1839 – May 14, 1846
 John J. Allen, December 14, 1840 – 1866
 Briscoe Baldwin, January 29, 1842 – 1852
 William Daniel, December 15, 1846 – 1866
 Richard C. L. Moncure, March 13, 1851 – June 3, 1869, 1870 – August 24, 1882
 Green Berry Samuels, 1852 – January 5, 1859
 George Hay Lee, 1852 – 1866
 William J. Robertson, May 1859 – 1866
 Lucas P. Thompson, 1866 (elected but died prior to taking office)
 William T. Joynes, 1866 – June 3, 1869, 1870 – March 2, 1872
 Alexander Rives, 1866 – June 3, 1869
 Horace Blois Burnham (June 9, 1869 – February 22, 1870)
 Orloff M. Dorman (June 9, 1869 – March 1, 1870)
 Westel Willoughby (June 9, 1869 – March 1, 1870)
 Joseph Christian January 1, 1871 – 1883
 Waller Redd Staples, January 1, 1871 – January 1, 1883
 Francis T. Anderson, January 1, 1871 – January 1, 1883
 Wood Bouldin, April 10, 1872 – October 10, 1876
 Edward C. Burks, November 1876 – January 1, 1883
 Lunsford L. Lewis, August 28, 1882 – January 1, 1895
 Robert A. Richardson, January 1, 1883 – January 1, 1895
 Thomas T. Fauntleroy, January 1, 1883 – January 1, 1895
 Drury A. Hinton, January 1, 1883 – January 1, 1895
 Benjamin W. Lacy, January 1, 1883 – January 1, 1895
 John W. Riely, January 1, 1895 – August 20, 1900
 John Alexander Buchanan, January 1, 1895 – January 12, 1916
 James Keith, January 1, 1895 – June 10, 1916
 Richard H. Cardwell, January 1, 1895 – November 16, 1916
 George Moffett Harrison, January 1, 1895 – March 6, 1917
 Archer Allen Phlegar, October 1, 1900 – February 1901
 Stafford G. Whittle, March 1901 – December 31, 1919
 Joseph L. Kelly, January 12, 1916 – January 31, 1924; March 10, 1925 – April 14, 1925
 Robert R. Prentis, December 16, 1916 – November 25, 1931
 Frederick W. Sims, February 8, 1917 – June 12, 1925
 Martin P. Burks, March 22, 1917 – April 30, 1928
 Edward W. Saunders, March 9, 1920 – December 16, 1921
 Jesse F. West, February 1, 1922 – October 25, 1929
 Preston W. Campbell, January 31, 1924 – October 1, 1946
 Richard Henry Lee Chichester, June 1, 1925 – February 3, 1930
 Henry W. Holt, June 1, 1928 – October 4, 1947
 Louis S. Epes, November 20, 1929 – February 14, 1935
 Herbert B. Gregory, February 1, 1930 – March 9, 1951
 Edward W. Hudgins, February 1, 1930 – July 29, 1958
 George L. Browning, February 19, 1930 – August 16, 1947
 Joseph W. Chinn, December 3, 1931 – August 16, 1936
 John W. Eggleston, February 26, 1935 – October 1, 1969
 Claude V. Spratley, August 27, 1936 – September 30, 1967
 Archibald C. Buchanan, October 1, 1946 – October 1, 1969
 Abram Penn Staples, October 7, 1947 – January 15, 1951
 Willis D. Miller, November 17, 1947 – December 20, 1960
 Lemuel F. Smith, February 15, 1951 – October 15, 1956
 Kennon C. Whittle, March 14, 1951 – February 1, 1965
 Harold Fleming Snead, January 14, 1957 – September 30, 1974
 Lawrence W. I'Anson, September 3, 1958 – January 31, 1981
 Harry L. Carrico, January 30, 1961 – January 31, 2003
 Thomas C. Gordon, February 17, 1965 – May 31, 1972
 Albertis Harrison, October 23, 1967 – December 31, 1981
 Alexander Harman, October 1, 1969 – December 31, 1979
 George M. Cochran, October 1, 1969 – April 20, 1987
 Richard Harding Poff, August 31, 1972 – December 31, 1988
 Christian Compton, October 1, 1974 – February 2, 2000
 William Carrington Thompson, February 19, 1980 – March 2, 1983
 Roscoe B. Stephenson Jr., March 2, 1981 – July 1, 1997
 John Charles Thomas, April 25, 1983 – November 1, 1989
 Henry H. Whiting, April 30, 1987 – August 12, 1995
 Elizabeth B. Lacy, January 4, 1989 – August 16, 2007
 Leroy R. Hassell Sr., December 28, 1989 – February 9, 2011
 Barbara Milano Keenan, July 2, 1991 – March 12, 2010
 Cynthia D. Kinser, July 8, 1997 – December 31, 2014
 Donald W. Lemons, March 16, 2000 – February 1, 2022
 G. Steven Agee, March 1, 2003 – June 30, 2008
 William C. Mims, April 1, 2010 – March 31, 2022
 Elizabeth A. McClanahan, August 1, 2011 – September 1, 2019
 Jane Marum Roush, August 1, 2015 – February 12, 2016

Succession of seats between 1895 and 2022
In 1895, for the first time, the General Assembly elected a full bench of five new judges. Consequently, any line of succession between a specific justice of the current court and a judge elected before 1895 necessarily would be arbitrary. However, when the General Assembly re-elected the incumbent judges in 1906 to fill the staggered seats created by the Constitution of 1902, it elected a specific judge to each seat: it re-elected Judge Cardwell for 4 years, Judge Whittle for 6, Judge Buchanan for 8, Judge Keith for 10, and Judge Harrison for 12. It therefore was possible to trace the line of succession of each of these seats, and the two new seats created in 1928, to its successive occupants.

Notes

External links
Encyclopedia of Virginia Biography (Note: some of the information contained is contradicted by primary sources.)

Virginia law
Justices of the Supreme Court
Virginia